Aziz Ullah Khan (born December 7, 1976) is a Pakistani politician, who was elected in 2021 Khyber Pakhtunkhwa local elections as a Mayor of Sarai Naurang, a tehsil of Lakki Marwat District, Khyber Pakhtunkhwa.

Political career 
In the 2021 Khyber Pakhtunkhwa local elections, Aziz Ullah won the Serai Naurang Tehsil Council election by taking 17792 votes as a member of Jamaat-e-Islami Pakistan and became the Mayor of Sarai Naurang on December 19, 2021. He took oath as Sarai Naurang mayor on December 25, 2021.

References 

Living people
Pashtun people
1976 births
Jamaat-e-Islami Pakistan politicians